Tartagal is a Spanish word derived from tártago (a spurge, Euphorbia lathyris). It may refer to either of three places in Argentina:
 Tartagal, Chaco
 Tartagal, Salta
 Tartagal, Santa Fe